Melomics109 is a computer cluster (three cabinets with customized front panels) located at Universidad de Málaga. It is part of the Spanish Supercomputing Network, and has been designed to increase the computational power provided by Iamus. Powered by Melomics' technology, the composing module of Melomics109 is able to create and synthesize music in a variety of musical styles. This music has been made freely accessible to everyone.

0music is the first album composed and interpreted by Melomics109, launched on July 21 under the name of  Melomics aims at freely distributing Melomics109's production, in all formats, and this album is the first one being released in audio (MP3) and editable format (MIDI), under CC0 (public domain) licensing. The rest of Melomics109's production can be browsed, listened to, and downloaded for free at Melomics'

External links
 Melomics home page
 Melomics page at University of Malaga (Spain)

References

Cluster computing
Music technology
Artificial intelligence art
One-of-a-kind computers
Spanish Supercomputing Network